The Hampton Inn, also known as The Maples Inn, is a historic former hotel property at 179 Oenoke Ridge in New Canaan, Connecticut.   It is a three-story wood frame Colonial Revival structure, built in 1908 as a vacation boarding house.  It is the only surviving building of its type in New Canaan.  The property was listed on the National Register of Historic Places in 2004.

Description and history

The former Hampton Inn stands north of the village center of New Canaan, on the east side of Oenoke Ridge opposite the First Presbyterian Church.  It is a large roughly rectangular frame structure, whose basic plan includes slightly projecting front-facing gables at both ends of the front facade.  A single-story porch wraps around the smaller left gable, its hip roof supported by square posts.  The property includes a c. 1890s innkeeper's residence and a more modern 1940s structure housing a garage and apartments.

The inn was built in 1908, capitalizing on a trend begun as early as 1869 to cater to a growing summer vacation trade in the town.  Early summer vacationers were boarded in private residences, with the adjacent William Bond House (now the Roger Sherman Inn) being one of the first to be fully converted for use as a boarding house.  The Hampton Inn was built for, and operated by, Mrs. W.H. Thompson.  Guests during its heyday included actress Lillian Gish and the wife of Chinese nationalist leader Chiang Kai-Shek.  Business declined in the post-World War II period, but the inn remained open, undergoing a major rehabilitation in the 1980s.  The building now no longer serves as an inn.

See also
National Register of Historic Places listings in Fairfield County, Connecticut

References

Buildings and structures in New Canaan, Connecticut
Hotel buildings on the National Register of Historic Places in Connecticut
Queen Anne architecture in Connecticut
Colonial Revival architecture in Connecticut
Commercial buildings completed in 1908
Hotels in Connecticut
Tourist attractions in Fairfield County, Connecticut
National Register of Historic Places in Fairfield County, Connecticut
1908 establishments in Connecticut